Terence Adamson (born 15 October 1948) is an English former professional footballer who played in the Football League as a defender for Luton Town and Hartlepools United.

References
General
 . Retrieved 31 October 2013.
Specific

1948 births
Living people
People from Houghton-le-Spring
Footballers from Tyne and Wear
English footballers
Association football defenders
Sunderland A.F.C. players
Luton Town F.C. players
Hartlepool United F.C. players
Scarborough F.C. players
Murton A.F.C. players
English Football League players